Trypanophora trapobanes is a moth in the Zygaenidae family. It was described by Francis Walker in 1854 from Sri Lanka. Its larval host plants are in the genus Lagerstroemia.

References

Moths described in 1854